Phoenix Mill was part of Henry Ford's Village industries project and ran from 1922 to 1948 in Plymouth, Michigan. Generator cutouts, voltage regulators, gauges and light switches for Ford vehicles were produced at the plant.

After the original gristmill burned down, Ford bought the site and commissioned Albert Kahn to design a new mill in 1921. Ford intended the factory to run entirely on a hydroelectric generator.

Employees
Workers at Phoenix Mill were mostly women, with male maintenance workers and a male manager. Before the union, women who were hired had to be single, widowed, or married with a husband who was not able to work. Workers had limited breaks and were under pressure to keep optimum efficiency, but were paid the same or more than men who had similar jobs.

Notes

Further Information
The University of Michigan-Dearborn Center for the Study of Automotive Heritage

Buildings and structures in Wayne County, Michigan
Ford village industries